The Attala County School District is a public school district based in Attala County, Mississippi (USA).

The district serves the towns of Ethel, Sallis, McCool, and the community of McAdams.

Schools
Ethel High School (Ethel; Grades 7-12)
McAdams High School (McAdams; Grades 7-12)
Greenlee Elementary (McCool; Grades PK-6)
Long Creek Elementary (Sallis; Grades PK-6)

Demographics

2006-07 school year
There were a total of 1,287 students enrolled in the Attala County School District during the 2006–2007 school year. The gender makeup of the district was 48% female and 52% male. The racial makeup of the district was 64.49% African American, 35.28% White, and 0.23% Hispanic. 65.9% of the district's students were eligible to receive free lunch.

Previous school years

Accountability statistics

See also
List of school districts in Mississippi

References

External links
Attala County School District

Education in Attala County, Mississippi
School districts in Mississippi